The IWF Youth World Championships is organised by the International Weightlifting Federation (IWF). The first competition was held in May 2009.

Editions

References

External links
 Results from 2012 to 2017
 All Results

 
Weightlifting competitions
World youth sports competitions